So I Married the Anti-fan is a 2021 South Korean streaming television series starring Choi Tae-joon, Choi Soo-young, Hwang Chan-sung, Han Ji-an and Kim Min-kyu. It is based on the 2010 novel of the same title which was made into a webtoon and was also previously adapted into a Chinese film. It aired from April 30 to June 19, 2021 on Naver TV, with simultaneous broadcast through V Live and global platforms iQIYI, Viki and Amazon Prime Video in Japan.

Synopsis
It is about the romance between top star Hoo Joon (Choi Tae-joon) and his anti-fan reporter Lee Geun-young (Choi Soo-young) who end up participating in a television show where they live together.

Cast

Main
 Choi Tae-joon as Hoo Joon, a world-famous superstar. Unlike his cold-hearted demeanor, he is a pure person who carries the pain of his first love.
 Choi Soo-young as Lee Geun-young, a magazine reporter who becomes Joon's "No.1 Anti-fan" after her life is ruined because of him.
 Hwang Chan-sung as JJ/Choi Jae-joon, a chaebol and the CEO of an entertainment agency.
 Han Ji-an as Oh In-hyung, a rising singer.
 Kim Min-kyu as Go Soo-hwan, Geun-young's friend who is a photographer.

Supporting
 Kim Sun-hyuk as Seo Ji-hyang, Joon's manager who takes care of him like a real younger brother.
 Kim Ha-kyung as Shin Mi-jung, Geun-young's best friend since elementary school.
 Dong Hyun-bae as Han Jae-won, a television show producer.
 Im Do-yoon as Noh Do-yoon
 Baek Seung-heon as Shin-hyung, Mi-jung's long time boyfriend.
 Ji Ho-sung as Kang Ji-hyuk, Joon's junior who believes and follows him like his own brother.
 Kim Hyung-min as Roy Ahn, Geun-young's ex-boyfriend who is a chef.
 Kim Min-kyo as the CEO of Joon's agency, Shooting Star.
 Yoo Seo-jin as Moon-hee, the editor-in-chief of Geun-young's company.
 Song Chae-yoon as Cha Yu-ri, Joon's biggest fan in his fan club.
 Park Dong-bin as Jo Hae-yoon

Special appearances
 Song Ji-eun as a flight attendant
 Sung Hoon as Choi Jae-hee, JJ's older brother.
 Jeon So-min as Kim Da-hyun ( 11)

Production and release
So I Married the Anti-fan is a pre-produced series. The first script reading of the cast was held on August 20, 2018, and filming began the same month.

The release of the series was delayed for three years due to difficulties in finding a television network to broadcast it. Adding to that, the two male leads, Choi Tae-joon and Hwang Chan-sung, started their military service not long after it had finished filming, so there were potential difficulties in promotional activities without them.

References

External links
 So I Married the Anti-fan on iQIYI
 So I Married the Anti-fan on Viki
 
 

Korean-language television shows
2021 South Korean television series debuts
2021 South Korean television series endings
South Korean romantic comedy television series
Television series by Warner Bros. Television Studios
South Korean pre-produced television series
Television shows based on South Korean novels
Naver TV original programming